Abbas II may refer to:

 Abbas II of Persia, (1632–1666), Shah of Iran from 1642 to 1666
 Abbas II of Egypt (also known as Abbas Hilmi Pasha) (1874–1944), last Khedive of Egypt and Sudan 1892–1914